David & Charles Ltd is an English publishing company. It is the owner of the David & Charles imprint, which specialises in craft and lifestyle publishing. 
David and Charles Ltd acts as distributor for all David and Charles Ltd books and content outside North America, and also distributes Interweave Press publications in the UK and worldwide excluding North America, and as foreign language editions. The company distributes Dover Publications and Reader's Digest books into the UK Trade and is also a UK and Europe distribution platform for the overseas acquired companies Krause Publications and Adams Media.

History

The current company was founded in 2019, taking the original founding name of the business that was first established in 1960. The company is the UK distributor for Dover Publications.

David and Charles was first founded in Newton Abbot, England, on 1 April 1960 by David St John Thomas and Charles Hadfield. It made its name publishing titles on Britain's canals and railways. The company's first employees worked from a hut in David St John Thomas' garden. As the business expanded the company relocated to the Newton Abbot railway station building, eventually taking over the locomotive shed for use as a warehouse. 

From 1965 to 1970 David & Charles had an extensive list of books published with the American imprint Augustus M. Kelley. These books were usually almost identical to the United Kingdom product but with changed dust jacket and publisher's information.

In 1971, the company bought Readers' Union, a group of book clubs catering to enthusiasts of needlecraft, handicrafts, gardening, equestrian pursuits and photography. The company's publishing programme began to reflect these subject areas, moving away from the traditional transport titles for which it had become known. Membership of the book clubs peaked at 268,000 members in 1992. 

The company was sold to Reader's Digest in 1990 before a subsequent management buy-out in 1997. In 2000, the company was bought by American company F+W Publications, which later became F+W Media. The growth of internet retailing led to the closure of the Readers' Union book clubs in 2008, which were replaced with the ecommerce business RUCraft. RUCraft rebranded to become Stitch Craft Create in January 2013.

The company was rebranded to become F&W Media International in 2010. It continued to publish new books under the David and Charles imprint, focusing entirely on craft and lifestyle categories. In October 2013, the company launched a UK ecommerce site in partnership with Burda Style. In November 2015, the company moved from Newton Abbot to Pynes Hill in Exeter and completed the acquisition of the online ecommerce business SewandSo.co.uk.

In March 2019, F+W Media announced entered Chapter 11 Bankruptcy proceedings. The book publishing assets of F&W Media International were acquired in a Management Buy-Out led by Managing Director, James Woollam. A new company was formed in July 2019 to complete the buy-out and was able to return to the David and Charles name.

Early publishing 
Among the early titles were The Canals of the British Isles series, edited and often written by Hadfield – he wrote in full or part, at least five of the volumes. Another series was the A Regional History of the Railways of Great Britain (15 volumes); with the first volume written by St John Thomas and which led to the publishing of two companion series: Forgotten Railways and Railway History in Pictures. The Scottish writer John Thomas wrote a series of books on Scotland railway lines and railway companies, first published in the 1960s and 1970s by the company. John Marshall was another railway historian published by the company. The company also published travel and topographical works from the 1960s through to the 1990s of which the Islands series and the Light and the Land books by Colin Baxter were the most prominent examples. In the twenty-first century their travel publishing continued with the "Most Amazing Places" series. One of their 1968 titles was a new edition of E. Temple Thurston's The Flower of Gloster which had been out of print since 1918. The book is today regarded as both a seminal work in canal literature and a classic example of Edwardian romanticism. The company also specialised in reprints of early technical and travel works and republished several issues of Baedeker's early-20th-century country guides as well some of the Edwardian works by Fred T Jane.

Online learning 
David and Charles creates course materials and operates the website www.RSNOnlineCourses.com, a partnership with the Royal School of Needlework to provide self-paced online learning courses.

See also

 List of English-language book publishing companies
 List of largest UK book publishers

References

Further reading

External links

1960 establishments in England
Book publishing companies of England
Companies based in Devon
Newton Abbot
Publishing companies established in 1960